Pau Esteve Birba (born 1981) is a Spanish cinematographer.

Biography 
Pau Esteve Birba was born in Barcelona in 1981. He graduated in photography from the ESCAC. Following his graduation he decided to move to Mexico in 2009. He was recalled to Spain to work in the second unit of Buried. He settled in Málaga towards 2017.

Filmography 
Cinematographer

Accolades

References 

1981 births

Living people
Spanish cinematographers